USS Piqua has been the name of more than one United States Navy ship, and may refer to:

 USS Piqua (SP-130), previously named , a patrol vessel in commission from 1917 to 1918 as USS Kanawha II and as USS Piqua from 1918 to 1919
 , a tug in service from 1967 to 2001

United States Navy ship names